The Things We Do to Find People Who Feel Like Us is the debut full-length album by American rock band Beach Slang, released on October 30, 2015, through Polyvinyl Record Co. and Big Scary Monsters in Europe.

Critical reception

The Things We Do to Find People Who Feel Like Us received mostly positive reviews from music critics. At Metacritic, which assigns a "weighted average" rating out of 100 from selected independent ratings and reviews from mainstream critics, the album received a Metascore of 78 out of 100, based on 23 reviews, indicating "generally favorable reviews." Praising the album's hooks and lyrical work, Ian Gormely of Exclaim! called The Things We Do to Find People Who Feel Like Us "a unique record, one that rages with youthful vigour."

Accolades

Track listing

Personnel
Credits adapted from AllMusic

Beach Slang
 James Alex — guitar, piano, vocals
 JP Flexner — drums
 Ruben Gallego — guitar
 Ed McNulty — bass

Other musicians
 Hannah Jordan — background vocals
 Megan Siebe — cello

Technical
 James Alex — production, artwork, design
 Dave Downham — engineer, production
 Alan Douches — mastering
 Mike Friedman — engineer
 Greg Pallante — photography
 Jon Stars — cover photo
 Matt Weber — assistant engineer

Chart performance

Release history

References

External links
iTunes - Music - The Things We Do to Find People Who Feel Like Us by Beach Slang

2015 debut albums
Beach Slang albums
Big Scary Monsters Recording Company albums
Polyvinyl Record Co. albums